Sinnae station is a railway station on the Gyeongchun Line and Seoul Subway Line 6.
The station is located near the Sinnae train depot, which is the depot of Line 6.
Line 6 currently only has 1 track and 1 platform, however, in the future, the Line 6 station will be expanded to 2 tracks and 2 platforms.
This station is also the first aboveground station on Line 6.

Station Layout

Gallery

External links

Seoul Metropolitan Subway stations
Metro stations in Jungnang District
Railway stations opened in 2013